Jerdonia indica, sometimes referred to as the Indian violet, is an erect shrub endemic to the south Western Ghats of India. It is the sole member of the monotypic genus Jerdonia within the family Gesneriaceae.

It was named after Thomas C. Jerdon by Robert Wight, who described the plant in 1848.

References

External links

 http://taxonomicon.taxonomy.nl/TaxonTree.aspx?id=673698

Didymocarpoideae
Flora of India (region)
Plants described in 1848